Aprophata eximia is a species of beetle in the family Cerambycidae. It was described by Newman in 1842, originally under the genus Abryna. It is known from the Philippines.

Varietas
 Aprophata eximia var. cuprea (Westwood, 1863)
 Aprophata eximia var. purpureonigricans (Westwood, 1863)
 Aprophata eximia var. viridis (Westwood, 1863)

References

Pteropliini
Beetles described in 1842